Pictou Landing (Gaelic Eilean Phiogto) is a community in the Canadian province of Nova Scotia, located in  Pictou County.

Geography
It is situated on the south shore of Pictou Harbour across from the town of Pictou.

History
Its name is probably derived from the fact that it is the landing place for ferries crossing the harbour. An earlier name for the area was Fishers Grant after a grant of land made to John Fisher in 1765. The only populated reserve of the Pictou Landing First Nation is named Fisher's Grant 24 and is located 3 km north-east of Pictou Landing.

The Nova Scotia Railway reached here in 1867. It was the main route for travelers to Upper Canada in the ice-free months until the opening of the Intercolonial Railway in 1876. The steamship Mayflower carried passengers and freight across the harbour.  A map published in 1879 shows four piers at Pictou Landing, three of them carrying track of the Intercolonial rail road and two of these piers belonging to coal companies.

References

Communities in Pictou County
General Service Areas in Nova Scotia